Soula is a commune in the Ariège department in southwestern France. The speleologist Joseph Delteil (1909–1979) was born in Soula.

Population
Inhabitants of Soula are called Soulanois.

See also
Communes of the Ariège department

References

Communes of Ariège (department)
Ariège communes articles needing translation from French Wikipedia